Dirty Harry is a Williams pinball machine released in March 1995. It is based on the fictional character of the same name.

Information 
The Dirty Harry pinball machine was designed by Barry Oursler; the art was produced by Kevin O'Connor and Pat McMahon; the animation was produced by Scott Slomiany, Adam Rhine and Brian Morris; the music and sound was produced by Vince Pontarelli; the mechanics of the game were produced by Zofia Bil. The pinball machine is recorded to weigh 250 pounds.

Dirty Harry is a multiplayer game that allows up to four players. The manufacturer of Dirty Harry is Williams Electronic Games, Inc., a subsidiary of WMS Industry. This pinball game falls under the themes of celebrities, fictional and licensed theme. The playfield of Dirty Harry includes shooting pinballs at targets, sinkholes, ramps and magnets in through loops.

Slogans 
The slogans that were included in the Dirty Harry pinball game include the following:
"You feel lucky?' You will when you get DIRTY HARRY."
"Do you feel lucky? You should. Because DIRTY HARRY just arrived on the scene. He's packing his famous .44 Magnum, a steely take-charge attitude, and a long list of players' most wanted pinball features. So answer the question. `Do"
"A Direct Hit!"
"Set your sights on a winner!"

References

External links 
 

Williams pinball machines
Pinball machines based on films
Dirty Harry video games
1995 pinball machines